I'm Your Man: The Life of Leonard Cohen is a biography of Leonard Cohen written by Sylvie Simmons and published by Ecco in 2012 (paperback 2013).

Reviews 
 
 New York Times Sunday Book Review by AM Holmes, October 12, 2012
 The Telegraph by Bernadette McNulty, November 14, 2012
 The Observer by Kitty Empire, Saturday, November 24, 2012

External links 

 Sylvie Simmons website
 Leonard Cohen Files website

Leonard Cohen
Biographies (books)
Canadian biographies
Biographies about writers
Biographies about musicians